"The Only Way Is Up" is a song by Dutch DJs and record producers Martin Garrix and Tiësto. The song premiered through a commercial ad presented by 7UP entitled "Team UP", which featured both artists. The collaborative track was released through Tiësto's Musical Freedom label as a digital download by Beatport. It was originally called "Voices" until it was released with the 7UP campaign and renamed "The Only Way Is Up". This commercial was filmed at the desert outside Las Vegas.

It features as a track on Tiësto's 2015 mixed compilation album Club Life: Volume Four New York City. Both DJs and record producers performed the song at Ultra Miami Festival 2015.

Track listing

Chart performance
The song charted at number 101 in the Netherlands its first week, topping the Dutch Single Tip chart (just below the Dutch Single Top 100 chart). The following week, it made its first appearance on the Single Top 100 at number 94.

Release history

References

2015 singles
2015 songs
Martin Garrix songs
Tiësto songs
Songs written by Martin Garrix
Songs written by Tiësto
Spinnin' Records singles